Seshadaripuram Degree College is an undergraduate college campus in Mysore city, Karnataka province, India.

History
Seshadaripuram Degree College was established in 2014 on the outer ring road in Mysore city. The college was established by a foundation called Seshadripuram Educational Trust.http://www.set.edu.in/groupinstitution.shtml  Noted social activist Sri. N.R.Panditharadhya is the current president of the Trust.

Courses Conducted
The college conducts six semester undergraduate courses like BBA, BCom and BCA as per the curriculum of the University of Mysore.

Facilities
The college has a well stocked library with internet facilities.  There are two laboratories for the students of Electronics and Computer Science.  The seminar hall of the college is equipped with audio visual facilities and can accommodate 200 participants.

References

Universities and colleges in Mysore
Colleges affiliated to University of Mysore
Educational institutions established in 2014
2014 establishments in Karnataka